Cnaphalocrocis trapezalis is a species of moth of the family Crambidae described by Achille Guenée in 1854. It can be found from Africa to the Pacific region, including Australia as well as in the Dominican Republic, Mexico and Peru.

Nutrition
They feed on grasses (Poaceae). Known host plants include Zea mays, Sorghum species, Panicum trichocladum and Oryza species.

References 

Moths described in 1854
Spilomelinae
Insect pests of millets